Vagra is one of the 182 Legislative Assembly constituencies of Gujarat state in India. It is part of Bharuch district.

List of segments 
This assembly seat represents the following segments,

 Vagra Taluka
 Bharuch Taluka (Part) : Villages – Adol, Aldar, Amdada

Members of Legislative Assembly 
1951-1952 - Ibrahim Ali Patel, Indian National Congress , Bombay Legislative Assembly
2007 - Iqbal Patel, Indian National Congress
2012 - Arunsinh Rana, Bharatiya Janata Party

Election results

2022

2017

2012

See also 
 List of constituencies of Gujarat Legislative Assembly
 Gujarat Legislative Assembly

References

External links
 

Assembly constituencies of Gujarat
Bharuch district